Sejdić and Finci v. Bosnia and Herzegovina (27996/06 and 34836/06) was a case (merged from two) decided by the Grand Chamber of the European Court of Human Rights in December 2009, in the first judgment finding a violation of Article 14 of the European Convention on Human Rights taken in conjunction with Article 3 of Protocol No. 1 thereof, with regard to the arrangements of the Constitution of Bosnia and Herzegovina in respect of the House of Peoples of Bosnia and Herzegovina, and a violation of Article 1 of Protocol No. 12 with regard to the constitutional arrangements on the Presidency of Bosnia and Herzegovina. 

The plaintiffs were two citizens of Bosnia and Herzegovina, Dervo Sejdić and Jakob Finci, who are of Roma and Jewish ethnicity, respectively.

Facts

The 1995 Constitution of Bosnia and Herzegovina, created as part of the Dayton Agreement which ended the 1992–1995 Bosnian War, included power-sharing provisions which provided that posts in the tripartite Presidency of Bosnia and Herzegovina and the House of Peoples (upper house of the national parliament) were reserved for ethnic Bosniaks, Bosnian Serbs and Bosnian Croats only. 

The applicants, being a Roma and a Jew, contested these provisions. Finci was represented by Clive Baldwin, formerly of Minority Rights Group International now with Human Rights Watch, and by Sheri Rosenberg of Cardozo Law School, with advice and assistance from Minority Rights Group International throughout. Dervo Sejdić was represented by F. Javier Leon Diaz, a Barrister and established human rights lawyer.

Proceedings

Applications were submitted in 2006 and communicated to the government in 2008. In 2009, the jurisdiction was relinquished to the Grand Chamber. 

In June 2009, a public hearing was held, and in December 2009 the judgment was published.

Trial
The Court found that applicants' ineligibility to stand for election to the House of Peoples violates Article 14 of ECHR (ban of discrimination in the field of Convention rights) taken in conjunction with Article 3 of Protocol No. 1 (free elections), by 14 votes to 3, and that their ineligibility to stand for election to the Presidency violates Article 1 of Protocol No. 12 (general ban of discrimination), by 16 votes to 1.

Judge Mijović (Bosnia and Herzegovina), joined by Judge Hajiyev (Azerbaijan), expressed a partly concurring and partly dissenting opinion, finding no violation in applicants' ineligibility to the House of Peoples.

Judge Bonello (Malta) expressed a dissent concerning both access to the presidency and to the House of Peoples.

Aftermath

In October 2011, the Parliamentary Assembly of Bosnia and Herzegovina set in motion a constitutional reform, including changing the election provisions.

In November 2014, the UK and German foreign ministers, Philip Hammond and Frank-Walter Steinmeier, sent an "open letter" to the people of Bosnia and Herzegovina, which pledged substantive progress towards Bosnia's EU membership if Bosnia's politicians gave a written commitment to implement a package of reforms, including compliance with the Sejdic and Finci ruling of the European Court of Human Rights. However, as of 2019, 10 years after the ECHR judgment, no reforms have been implemented.

References

Bibliography

External links
 Judgment
 Webcast of the hearing
 Minority Rights Group's briefing paper on the consequences of the ruling
 Milanovic, Marko Sejdic and Finci v. Bosnia and Herzegovina (September 6, 2010). American Journal of International Law, Vol. 104, 2010.
 Bardutzky, Samo The Strasbourg Court on the Dayton Constitution: Judgment in the case of Sejdić and Finci v. Bosnia and Herzegovina, 22 December 2009 (October 19, 2010). European Constitutional Law Review, Vol. 6, Issue 2.
 Hodzic, Edin and Nenad Stojanovic New/Old Constitutional Engineering? Challenges and Implications of the European Court of Human Rights Decision in the Case of Sejdic and Finci v. BiH. Sarajevo: Analitika - Center for Social Research, 2011.

Article 14 of the European Convention on Human Rights
Article 3 of Protocol No. 1 of the European Convention on Human Rights
Jewish Bosnian history
Romani in Bosnia and Herzegovina
European Court of Human Rights cases decided by the Grand Chamber
European Court of Human Rights cases involving Bosnia and Herzegovina
Elections in Bosnia and Herzegovina
Electoral restrictions
2009 in case law
2009 in Bosnia and Herzegovina
Bosnia and Herzegovina–European Union relations